Lorenzo Pinzauti (born 9 September 1994) is an Italian professional footballer who plays as a forward for  club Lecco.

Career
Born in Fiesole, Pinzauti started his career in Jolly Montemurlo on Serie D. He played four seasons in Serie D.

On 31 January 2017, he signed with Serie C club Tuttocuoio. He made his professional debut on 19 February against Carrarese.

For the 2017–18 season, he joined to Pontedera in  Serie C, he played two years in the club.

On 17 July 2019, he signed with Teramo. He was loaned to Novara on 30 August 2019.

On 17 August 2021, he moved to Pistoiese.

On 8 July 2022, Pinzauti joined Lecco on a two-year contract.

References

External links
 
 

1994 births
Living people
People from Fiesole
Sportspeople from the Metropolitan City of Florence
Footballers from Tuscany
Italian footballers
Association football forwards
Serie C players
Serie D players
A.S.D. Jolly Montemurlo players
A.C. Tuttocuoio 1957 San Miniato players
U.S. Città di Pontedera players
S.S. Teramo Calcio players
Novara F.C. players
U.S. Pistoiese 1921 players
Calcio Lecco 1912 players